Reyes is a municipality of the José Ballivián Province in the Beni Department of Bolivia. The seat of the municipality is the city of Reyes.

References 

  Instituto Nacional de Estadistica de Bolivia (INE)

Municipalities of Beni Department